Neurosciences Institute or Neurosciences Institute may refer to:

 The Neurosciences Institute, former American nonprofit scientific research organization
 Neurosciences Institute, Saint Thomas - West Hospital, Nashville, Tennessee, U.S.
Helen Wills Neuroscience Institute at the University of California, Berkeley, U.S.
Luria Neuroscience Institute in New York City, U.S.
National Neuroscience Institute, Singapore
 Bangur Institute of Neurosciences, Bhawanipur, Kolkata, West Bengal, India
 Princeton Neuroscience Institute, at Princeton University, New Jersey, U.S.
Netherlands Institute for Neuroscience
Texas Neurosciences Institute, U.S.
Mischer Neuroscience Institute, Texas, U.S.
International Institute for Neuroscience of Natal
National Institute of Neuroscience, Dhaka, Bangladesh
Hoag Neurosciences Institute, Orange County, California, U.S.